Caledonian Airways was a British charter airline established in 1988 by rebranding British Airtours when that company's parent British Airways took over British Caledonian. It merged in 2000 with Flying Colours Airlines to form JMC Air.

History

Caledonian Airways was formed in 1988 when British Airways acquired British Caledonian. The British Airways air charter subsidiary British Airtours was rebranded as Caledonian Airways.

In 1995 British Airways sold Caledonian Airways to UK tour operator Inspirations, part of the Carlson Group. Between 1997 and 1998 Caledonian Airways operated four aircraft under the name Peach Air.

Inspirations became part of the Thomas Cook in 2000. Caledonian Airways was merged with Flying Colours Airlines to form JMC Air. Who then renamed to Thomas Cook Airlines, being part of the newly formed Thomas Cook AG.

Fleet
Caledonian Airways operated 32 aircraft during its 12 years in operation including six Airbus A320, six Boeing 737-200, one Boeing 747-200, eight Boeing 757-200, seven Lockheed L-1011 and four McDonnell Douglas DC-10.

References

External links

Airlines established in 1988
Airlines disestablished in 2000
British Airways
Companies based in Crawley
Defunct charter airlines of the United Kingdom
1988 establishments in England
2000 disestablishments in England
British companies established in 1988
British companies disestablished in 2000